Majdala, born Naziha Moukarzel (October 12, 1946 – January 31, 2020) was a Lebanese singer, mostly known for her work during the "Golden Age" of Lebanon, between 1952 and 1976.

Biography
Her name was created by Nadia Tueni, who also wrote her first musical play: Al Faraman. Majdala was discovered by producer Romeo Lahoud. He presented her to the Baalbeck Festival Jury in 1970, which directly agreed on his choice.

She played many first roles such as Safra in Al Faraman, at the 1970 Baalbeck Festival, and also four times at the Beiteddine Festival between 1971 and 1975, with Madinit el Farah, Bahr El Loulou, Mawsim El Tarrabich, and Wadi el Ghazar.

She sang with such performers as Wadih El Safi, Nasri Chams El Din, Philimon Wehbe, Joseph Azar, Samir Yazbeck, Issam Rajji, Antoine Kerbaj, Rida Khoury, Chouchou, Melhim Barakat, Marwan Mahfouz, Fehmen, Samir Rahal, Nadim Berberi, Georgette Sayyigh, and Nabih Abou El Hessen.

The composers of her songs were Zaki Nassif, Romeo Lahoud, Issam Rajji, Elie Choueiry, Melhim Barakat, Elias El Rahbani, Ziad Rahbani, Azar Habib, Philimon Wehbe and Hassan Abd El Nabi.

In 1976 the Lebanese Civil War began, and Majdala decided to retire from singing. She married Nabil Khater and gave birth in 1977 to her daughter Majdala Khater. In 1981, she gave birth to her second child, her son Nidal Khater. She then moved to France, where she spent a large part of her life raising her children. In 1999, she decided to return to Lebanon, where she lived until her death in 2020.

In November 2008, with composer Ihsan Al Mounzer, she released a new version of her song "Ghanili Ba3ed", followed by "Ghano El Assayid".

Discography
3abassa El Chawk
3al Darb El Ba3idi
3alatoul Ya Habibi Nattir
3am Tollik ya Madinetna3amer Darrak 3al 3alli3ouyoun El GhazalAna Wedaytelo MkatibiAna Wel Rih El JabaliyiAtafou El WardBta3rif Ya AmarnaDakhlak Ya HabibiDakhlak Ya MersalliDayim Dayim Ya BladiGhanili Ba3edGhano El AsayidGharibiHabibi Ismo LubnanHajarounaHallak HalMara2 el SayfMchina MchinaNatartak 3al RawabiRayha Mchawir B3aedSa2alouni Ya HabibiSehir El LaylSotfi KanitTahet El ZayzafouniTarakouni Ahli Bi Hal LeilTayyir TayyirWayn Sarro El AhbabYa Amar Ya NassinaYa Nijmit El Layl''

References

External links
 Her funeral

1946 births
2020 deaths
20th-century Lebanese women singers